The Directorate of Military Intelligence is the intelligence arm of the Sri Lankan armed forces. Elite Special Forces Long Range Reconnaissance Patrol unit operates under the Directorate of Military Intelligence of the Army.

Director of Military Intelligence 
 Brigadier Lionel Balagalle
 Brigadier Shantha Kottegoda 
 Brigadier Kapila Hendawitharana
 Brigadier Suresh Sallay
 Brigadier Robin Jayasuriya

See also
State Intelligence Service (Sri Lanka)
Military Intelligence Corps (Sri Lanka)

References

References and external links
Men who killed Thamilselvam speak

Defence agencies of Sri Lanka
Military intelligence agencies
Sri Lankan intelligence agencies
Military units and formations of the Sri Lanka Army
Military Intelligence Corps (Sri Lanka)